Enver Hadri (1941 – 25 February 1990) was a Kosovo Albanian human rights activist. According to an Albanian blog AACL, he was assassinated while he stopped at a traffic light in Brussels, by three Yugoslavians allegedly working for State Security Administration (UDBA).  This happened in the commune of Saint-Gilles, at the crossroads between the rue St Bernard and the rue de la Victoire. Hadri had with him the list of 32 Albanians killed in Kosovo by Serbia, which he would submit to the European Parliament's Human Rights Committee the next day. He lived in Brussels since 1972 where he worked to put on agenda the human rights of Albanians in Kosovo.

The killers were Andrija Lakonić, Veselin Vukotić and Darko Ašanin. Lakonić was killed in Serbia by Vukotić shortly after the murder of Hadri, while Ašanin was first arrested in Greece where he was about to be delivered to Belgian authorities when the Greek Minister of Justice intervened and he was delivered to Serbia. Same year he was killed in Serbia. Veselin Vukotić was arrested in Spain in 2006. According to Spanish police, Vukotić in addition to killing Enver Hadri, also had documents incriminating former Yugoslav President Slobodan Milošević in numerous assassinations. In April 2003, a protected U.N. war crimes prosecution witness who said he had worked for Yugoslavia's secret service claimed in Milošević's trial in The Hague that Vukotić once admitted to killing Hadri. The protected witness testifying from behind tinted glass said: Vukotić 'told me about the liquidation of Albanians around Europe'. He did it under the orders of the Yugoslav secret service. The last he mentioned was that he killed Hadri.

References

Kosovo Albanians
1941 births
1990 deaths
People murdered in Belgium
People from Peja
Assassinated Yugoslav people